Backgammon is a two-player board game played with counters and dice on tables boards. It is the most widespread Western member of the large family of tables games, whose ancestors date back nearly 5,000 years to the regions of Mesopotamia and Persia. The earliest record of backgammon itself dates to 17th-century England, being descended from the 16th-century game of Irish.

Backgammon is a two-player game of contrary movement in which each player has fifteen pieces known traditionally as men (short for 'tablemen'), but increasingly known as 'checkers' in the US in recent decades, analogous to the other board game of Checkers. The backgammon table pieces move along twenty-four 'points' according to the roll of two dice. The objective of the game is to move the fifteen pieces around the board and be first to bear off, i.e., remove them from the board. The achievement of this while the opponent is still a long way behind results in a triple win known as a backgammon, hence the name of the game.

Backgammon involves a combination of strategy and luck (from rolling dice). While the dice may determine the outcome of a single game, the better player will accumulate the better record over a series of many games. With each roll of the dice, players must choose from numerous options for moving their pieces and anticipate possible counter-moves by the opponent. The optional use of a doubling cube allows players to raise the stakes during the game.

History 

Contrary to popular belief, backgammon is not the oldest board game in the world, nor are all tables games variants of backgammon. In fact, the earliest known mention of backgammon was in a letter dated 1635, when it was emerging as a variant of the popular mediaeval Anglo-Scottish game of Irish; the latter was described as a better game. By the 19th century, however, backgammon had spread to Europe, where it rapidly superseded other tables games like Trictrac in popularity, and also to America, where the doubling cube was introduced. In other parts of the world, different tables games such as Nard or Nardy are better known.

Tables games 

Backgammon is a recent member of the large family of tables games that date back to ancient times. The following is an overview of their development up to the time when backgammon appeared on the scene.

Ancient history 

The history of board games can be traced back nearly 5,000 years to archaeological discoveries of the Jiroft culture, located in present-day Iran, the world's oldest game set having been discovered in the region with equipment comprising a dumbbell-shaped board, counters and dice. Although its precise rules are unknown, it has been termed the Game of 20 Squares and Irving Finkel has suggested a possible reconstruction. The Royal Game of Ur from 2600 BC may also be an ancestor or intermediate of modern-day table games like backgammon and is the oldest game for which rules have been handed down. It used tetrahedral dice. Various other board games spanning the 10th to 7th centuries BC have been found throughout modern day Iraq, Syria, Israel, Egypt and western Iran.

Sasanian Empire 

The Persian tables game of nard or nardšir emerged somewhere between the 3rd and 6th century AD, one text (Kār-nāmag ī Ardaxšēr ī Pāpakān) linking it with Ardashir I (r. 224–41), founder of the Sasanian dynasty, whereas another (Wičārišn ī čatrang ud nihišn ī nēw-ardaxšēr) attributes it to Bozorgmehr Bokhtagan, the vizier of Khosrow I (r. 531–79), who is credited with the invention of the game.

Roman and Byzantine Empires 

The earliest identifiable tables game, Tabula, meaning 'table' or 'board', is described in an epigram of Byzantine Emperor Zeno (AD 476–491). The overall aim was to be first to bear one's pieces off; the board had the typical tables layout, with 24 points, 12 on each side; and there were 15 counters per player. However, unlike modern Western backgammon, there were three cubical dice not two, no bar nor doubling die, and all counters started off the board. Modern backgammon follows the same rules as tabula for hitting a blot and for bearing off; and the rules for re-entering pieces in backgammon are the same as those for initially entering pieces in tabula. The name Tavla is still used in Greece for various tables games, which are frequently played in town plateias and cafes.

The  of Emperor Zeno's time is believed to be a direct descendant of the earlier Roman Ludus duodecim scriptorum ('Game of twelve lines') with the board's middle row of points removed, and only the two outer rows remaining.  used a board with three rows of 12 points each, with the 15 pieces being moved in opposing directions by the two players across three rows according to the roll of the three cubical dice. Little specific text about the gameplay of  has survived; it may have been related to the older Ancient Greek dice game Kubeia. The earliest known mention of the game is in Ovid's Ars Amatoria ('The Art of Love'), written between 1 BC and 8 AD. In Roman times, this game was also known as alea.

Western Europe 

Tables games first appeared in France during the 11th century and became a favourite pastime of gamblers. In 1254, Louis IX issued a decree prohibiting his court officials and subjects from playing. They were played in Germany in the 12th century, and had reached Iceland by the 13th century. In Spain, the Alfonso X manuscript Libro de los juegos, completed in 1283, describes rules for a number of dice and table games in addition to its discussion of chess. By the 17th century, games at tables had spread to Sweden. A wooden board and counters were recovered from the wreck of the Vasa among the belongings of the ship's officers. Tables games appear widely in paintings of this period, mainly those of Dutch and German painters, such as Van Ostade, Jan Steen, Hieronymus Bosch, and Bruegel. Among surviving artworks are Cardsharps by Caravaggio.

Backgammon

Early backgammon 

Backgammon's immediate predecessor was the 16th century tables game of Irish. Irish was the Anglo-Scottish equivalent of the French Toutes Tables and Spanish Todas Tablas, the latter name first being used in the 1283 El Libro de los Juegos, a translation of Arabic manuscripts by the Toledo School of Translators. Irish had been popular at the Scottish court of James IV and considered to be "the more serious and solid game" when the variant which became known as Backgammon began to emerge in the first half of the 17th century.  In medieval Italy, Barail was played on a backgammon board, with the important difference that both players moved their pieces counter-clockwise and starting from the same side of the board. The game rules for Barail are recorded in a 13th century manuscript held in the Italian National Library in Florence.

The earliest mention of backgammon, under the name Baggammon, was by James Howell in a letter dated 1635. Meanwhile, the first use documented by the Oxford English Dictionary was in 1650. In 1666, it is reported that the "old name for backgammon used by Shakespeare and others" was Tables. However, it is clear from Willughby that "tables" was a generic name and that the phrase "playing at tables" was used in a similar way to "playing at cards". The first known rules of "Back Gammon" were produced by Francis Willughby around 1672; they were quickly followed by Charles Cotton in 1674.

In the 16th century, Elizabethan laws and church regulations had prohibited "playing at tables" in England, but by the 18th century, Backgammon had superseded Irish and become popular among the English clergy. Edmond Hoyle published A Short Treatise on the Game of Back-Gammon in 1753; this described rules and strategy for the game and was bound together with a similar text on whist.

The early form of backgammon was very similar to its predecessor, Irish. The aim, board, number of pieces or "men", direction of play and starting layout were the same as in the modern game. However, there was no doubling die, there was no bar on the board or the bar was not used (men simply being moved off the table when hit) and the scoring was different. The game was won double if either the winning throw was a doublet or the opponent still had men outside the home board. It was won triple if a player bore all men off before any of the opponent's men reached the home board; this was a back-gammon. Some terminology, such as "point", "hitting a blot", "home", "doublet", "bear off" and "men" are recognisably the same as in the modern game; others, such as "binding a man" (adding a second man to a point) "binding up the tables" (taking all one's first 6 points), "fore game", "latter game", "nipping a man" (hitting a blot and playing it on forwards) "playing at length" (using both dice to move one man) are no longer in vogue.

Modern backgammon 

By no later than 1850, the rules of play had changed to those used today. Tables boards were now made with a 'bar' in the centre and men that were hit went onto the bar. Winning double or by "two hits" was achieved by bearing all one's men off before the other has borne this was now called a gammon. If the winner bore off all men while the loser still had men in his adversary's table, it was a back-gammon and worth "three hits", i.e., triple.

The most recent major development in backgammon was the addition of the doubling cube. Doubles had originally been recorded by placing "common parlour matches" on the bar in the centre of the board. A doubling cube was first introduced in the 1920s in New York City among members of gaming clubs in the Lower East Side. The cube required players not only to select the best move in a given position, but also to estimate the probability of winning from that position, transforming backgammon into the expected value-driven game played in the 20th and 21st centuries.

The popularity of backgammon surged in the mid-1960s, in part due to the charisma of Prince Alexis Obolensky who became known as "The Father of Modern Backgammon". "Obe", as he was called by friends, co-founded the International Backgammon Association, which published a set of official rules. He also established the World Backgammon Club of Manhattan, devised a backgammon tournament system in 1963, then organized the first major international backgammon tournament in March 1964, which attracted royalty, celebrities and the press. The game became a huge fad and was played on college campuses, in discothèques and at country clubs; stockbrokers and bankers began playing at conservative men's clubs. People young and old all across the country dusted off their boards and pieces. Cigarette, liquor and car companies began to sponsor tournaments, and Hugh Hefner held backgammon parties at the Playboy Mansion. Backgammon clubs were formed and tournaments were held, resulting in a World Championship promoted in Las Vegas in 1967.

In the second half of the 20th century, new terms were introduced in America, such as 'beaver' and 'checkers' for men (although American backgammon experts Jacoby and Crawford continued to use both).

Most recently, the United States Backgammon Federation (USBGF) was organized in 2009 to repopularize the game in the United States. Board and committee members include many of the top players, tournament directors and writers in the worldwide backgammon community. The USBGF has recently created Standards of Ethical Practice to address issues on which tournament rules fail to touch.

In its country of origin, the UK Backgammon Federation is the national authority and runs a backgammon the Backgammon Galaxy UK Open as well as club championships, online leagues and knockout tournaments. Like the USBGF they are active members of the World Backgammon Federation (WBF) and their tournament rules have been adopted in their entirety by the WBF.

Rules 

Since 2018, backgammon has been overseen internationally by the World Backgammon Federation who set the rules of play for international tournaments.

Backgammon playing pieces may be termed men, checkers, draughts, stones, counters, pawns, discs, pips, chips, or nips. Checkers is American English and is derived from another board game, draughts, which in US English is called checkers.

The objective is for players to bear off all their disc pieces from the board before their opponent can do the same. As the playing time for each individual game is short, it is often played in matches where victory is awarded to the first player to reach a certain number of points.

Board 

The dimensions of a board when opened, for a tournament game, should be at a minimum of 44 cm by 55 cm to a maximum of 66 cm by 88 cm.

Setup 

Each side of the board has a track of 12 long triangles, called points. The points form a continuous track in the shape of a horseshoe, and are numbered from 1 to 24. In the most commonly used setup, each player begins with fifteen pieces; two are placed on their 24-point, three on their 8-point, and five each on their 13-point and their 6-point. The two players move their pieces in opposing directions, from the 24-point towards the 1-point.

Points 1 through 6 are called the home board or inner board, and points 7 through 12 are called the outer board. The 7-point is referred to as the bar point, and the 13-point as the midpoint. Usually the 5-point for each player is called the "golden point".

Movement 

To start the game, each player rolls one die, and the player with the higher number moves first using the numbers shown on both dice. If the players roll the same number, they must roll again, leaving the first pair of dice on the board. The player with the higher number on the second roll moves using only the numbers shown on the dice used for the second roll.  Both dice must land completely flat on the right-hand side of the gameboard. The players then take alternate turns, rolling two dice at the beginning of each turn.

After rolling the dice, players must, if possible, move their pieces according to the number shown on each die. For example, if the player rolls a 6 and a 3 (denoted as "6-3"), the player must move one checker six points forward, and another or the same checker three points forward. The same checker may be moved twice, as long as the two moves can be made separately and legally: six and then three, or three and then six. If a player rolls two of the same number, called doubles, that player must play each die twice. For example, a roll of 5-5 allows the player to make four moves of five spaces each. On any roll, a player must move according to the numbers on both dice if it is at all possible to do so. If one or both numbers do not allow a legal move, the player forfeits that portion of the roll and the turn ends. If moves can be made according to either one die or the other, but not both, the higher number must be used. If one die is unable to be moved, but such a move is made possible by the moving of the other die, that move is compulsory.

In the course of a move, a checker may land on any point that is unoccupied or is occupied by one or more of the player's own checkers. It may also land on a point occupied by exactly one opposing checker, or "blot". In this case, the blot has been "hit" and is placed in the middle of the board on the bar that divides the two sides of the playing surface. A checker may never land on a point occupied by two or more opposing checkers; thus, no point is ever occupied by checkers from both players simultaneously. There is no limit to the number of checkers that can occupy a point or the bar at any given time.

Checkers placed on the bar must re-enter the game through the opponent's home board before any other move can be made. A roll of 1 allows the checker to enter on the 24-point (opponent's 1), a roll of 2 on the 23-point (opponent's 2), and so forth, up to a roll of 6 allowing entry on the 19-point (opponent's 6). Checkers may not enter on a point occupied by two or more opposing checkers. Checkers can enter on unoccupied points, or on points occupied by a single opposing checker; in the latter case, the single checker is hit and placed on the bar. A player may not move any other checkers until all checkers belonging to that player on the bar have re-entered the board. If a player has checkers on the bar, but rolls a combination that does not allow any of those checkers to re-enter, the player does not move. If the opponent's home board is completely "closed" (i.e. all six points are each occupied by two or more checkers), there is no roll that will allow a player to enter a checker from the bar, and that player stops rolling and playing until at least one point becomes open (occupied by one or zero checkers) due to the opponent's moves.

A turn ends only when the player has removed his/her dice from the board. Prior to this moment, a move can be undone and replayed an unlimited number of times.

Bearing off 

When all of a player's checkers are in that player's home board, that player may start removing them; this is called "bearing off". A roll of 1 may be used to bear off a checker from the 1-point, a 2 from the 2-point, and so on. If all of a player's checkers are on points lower than the number showing on a particular die, the player must use that die to bear off one checker from the highest occupied point. For example, if a player rolls a 6 and a 5, but has no checkers on the 6-point and two on the 5-point, then the 6 and the 5 must be used to bear off the two checkers from the 5-point. When bearing off, a player may also move a lower die roll before the higher even if that means the full value of the higher die is not fully utilized. For example, if a player has exactly one checker remaining on the 6-point, and rolls a 6 and a 1, the player may move the 6-point checker one place to the 5-point with the lower die roll of 1, and then bear that checker off the 5-point using the die roll of 6; this is sometimes useful tactically. As before, if there is a way to use all moves showing on the dice by moving checkers within the home board or by bearing them off, the player must do so. If a player's checker is hit while in the process of bearing off, that player may not bear off any others until it has been re-entered into the game and moved into the player's home board, according to the normal movement rules.

The first player to bear off all fifteen of their own checkers wins the game. When keeping score in backgammon, the points awarded depend on the scale of the victory.  When each player is in the process of bearing off pieces and a winner emerges, that is called a "game" and is worth 1 point.  If one player has not yet removed any pieces from the board OR has any pieces  NOT in their home area, that is called a "gammon" and is worth 2 points.  If the losing player has any pieces in their opponent's home area OR up on the bar, that is called a "backgammon" and is worth 3 points.

Doubling cube 

To speed up match play and to provide an added dimension for strategy, a doubling cube is usually used. The doubling cube is not a die to be rolled, but rather a marker, with the numbers 2, 4, 8, 16, 32, and 64 inscribed on its sides to denote the current stake. At the start of each game, the doubling cube is placed on the midpoint of the bar with the number 64 showing; the cube is then said to be "centered, on 1". When the cube is still centered, either player may start their turn by proposing that the game be played for twice the current stakes. Their opponent must either accept ("take") the doubled stakes or resign ("drop") the game immediately.

Whenever a player accepts doubled stakes, the cube is placed on their side of the board with the corresponding power of two facing upward, to indicate that the right to redouble, which is to offer to continue doubling the stakes, belongs exclusively to that player. If the opponent drops the doubled stakes, they lose the game at the current value of the doubling cube. For instance, if the cube showed the number 2 and a player wanted to redouble the stakes to put it at 4, the opponent choosing to drop the redouble would lose two, or twice the original stake.

There is no limit on the number of redoubles. Although 64 is the highest number depicted on the doubling cube, the stakes may rise to 128, 256, and so on. In money games, a player is often permitted to "beaver" when offered the cube, doubling the value of the game again, while retaining possession of the cube.

A variant of the doubling cube "beaver" is the "raccoon". Players who doubled their opponent, seeing the opponent beaver the cube, may in turn then double the stakes once again ("raccoon") as part of that cube phase before any dice are rolled. The opponent retains the doubling cube. An example of a "raccoon" is the following: White doubles Black to 2 points, Black accepts then beavers the cube to 4 points; White, confident of a win, raccoons the cube to 8 points, while Black retains the cube. Such a move adds greatly to the risk of having to face the doubling cube coming back at 8 times its original value when first doubling the opponent (offered at 2 points, counter offered at 16 points) should the luck of the dice change.

Some players may opt to invoke the "Murphy rule" or the "automatic double rule". If both opponents roll the same opening number, the doubling cube is incremented on each occasion yet remains in the middle of the board, available to either player. The Murphy rule may be invoked with a maximum number of automatic doubles allowed and that limit is agreed to prior to a game or match commencing. When a player decides to double the opponent, the value is then a double of whatever face value is shown (e.g. if two automatic doubles have occurred putting the cube up to 4, the first in-game double will be for 8 points). The Murphy rule is not an official rule in backgammon and is rarely, if ever, seen in use at officially sanctioned tournaments.

The "Jacoby rule", named after Oswald Jacoby, allows gammons and backgammons to count for their respective double and triple values only if the cube has already been offered and accepted. This encourages a player with a large lead to double, possibly ending the game, rather than to play it to conclusion hoping for a gammon or backgammon. The Jacoby rule is widely used in money play but is not used in match play.

The "Crawford rule", named after John R. Crawford, is designed to make match play more equitable for the player in the lead. If a player is one point away from winning a match, that player's opponent will always want to double as early as possible in order to catch up. Whether the game is worth one point or two, the trailing player must win to continue the match. To balance the situation, the Crawford rule requires that when a player first reaches a score one point short of winning, neither player may use the doubling cube for the following game, called the "Crawford game". After the Crawford game, normal use of the doubling cube resumes. The Crawford rule is routinely used in tournament match play. It is possible for a Crawford game to never occur in a match.

If the Crawford rule is in effect, then another option is the "Holland rule", named after Tim Holland, which stipulates that after the Crawford game, a player cannot double until after at least two rolls have been played by each side. It was common in tournament play in the 1980s, but is now rarely used.

Related games 

Minor variations to the standard game are common among casual players in certain regions. For instance, only allowing a maximum of five men on any point (Britain) or disallowing "hit-and-run" in the home board (Middle East).

There are also many relatives of backgammon within the tables family with different aims, modes of play and strategies. Some are played primarily throughout one geographic region, and others add new tactical elements to the game. These other tables games commonly have a different starting position, restrict certain moves, or assign special value to certain dice rolls, but in some geographic games even the rules and direction of movement of the counters change, rendering them fundamentally different.

Acey-deucey is a relative of backgammon in which players start with no counters on the board, and must enter them onto the board at the beginning of the game. The roll of 1-2 is given special consideration, allowing the player, after moving the 1 and the 2, to select any desired doubles move. A player also receives an extra turn after a roll of 1-2 or of doubles.

Hypergammon is a game in which players have only three counters on the board, starting with one each on the 24, 23 and 22 points. With the aid of a computer this game was solved by Hugh Sconyers around 1994, meaning that exact equities for all cube positions are available for all 32 million possible positions.

Nard is a traditional tables game from Persia which may be an ancestor of backgammon. It has a different opening layout in which all 15 pieces start on the 24th point. During play pieces may not be hit and there are no gammons or backgammons.

Russian backgammon is a variant described in 1895 as: "...much in vogue in Russia, Germany, and other parts of the Continent...". Players start with no counters on the board, and both players move in the same direction to bear off in a common home board. In this variant, doubles are powerful: four moves are played as in backgammon, followed by four moves according to the difference of the dice value from 7, and then the player has another turn (with the caveat that the turn ends if any portion of it cannot be completed).

Gul bara and Tapa are tables games popular in south-eastern Europe and Turkey. The play will iterate among Backgammon, Gul Bara, and Tapa until one of the players reaches a score of 7 or 5.

Coan ki is an ancient Chinese tables game.

Plakoto, Fevga and Portes are three varieties of tables games played in Greece. Together, the three are referred to as Tavli and are usually played one after the other; game being three, five, or seven points.

Misere (backgammon to lose) is a variant of backgammon in which the objective is to lose the game.

Tavla is a Turkish variation.

Strategy and tactics 

Backgammon has an established opening theory, although it is less detailed than that of chess. The tree of positions expands rapidly because of the number of possible dice rolls and the moves available on each turn. Recent computer analysis has offered more insight on opening plays, but the midgame is reached quickly. After the opening, backgammon players frequently rely on some established general strategies, combining and switching among them to adapt to the changing conditions of a game.

A blot has the highest probability of being hit when it is 6 points away from an opponent's checker. Strategies can derive from that. The most direct one is simply to avoid being hit, trapped, or held in a stand-off. A "running game" describes a strategy of moving as quickly as possible around the board, and is most successful when a player is already ahead in the race. When this fails, one may opt for a "holding game", maintaining control of a point on one's opponent's side of the board, called an anchor. As the game progresses, this player may gain an advantage by hitting an opponent's blot from the anchor, or by rolling large doubles that allow the checkers to escape into a running game.

The "priming game" involves building a wall of checkers, called a prime, covering a number of consecutive points. This obstructs opposing checkers that are behind the prime. A checker trapped behind a six-point prime cannot escape until the prime is broken. A particularly successful priming effort may lead to a "blitz", which is a strategy of covering the entire home board as quickly as possible while keeping one's opponent on the bar. Because the opponent has difficulty re-entering from the bar or escaping, a player can quickly gain a running advantage and win the game, often with a gammon.

A "backgame" is a strategy that involves holding two or more anchors in an opponent's home board while being substantially behind in the race. The anchors obstruct the opponent's checkers and create opportunities to hit them as they move home. The backgame is generally used only to salvage a game wherein a player is already significantly behind. Using a backgame as an initial strategy is usually unsuccessful.

"Duplication" refers to the placement of checkers such that one's opponent needs the same dice rolls to achieve different goals. For example, players may position all of their blots in such a way that the opponent must roll a 2 in order to hit any of them, reducing the probability of being hit more than once. "Diversification" refers to a complementary tactic of placing one's own checkers in such a way that more numbers are useful.

Many positions require a measurement of a player's standing in the race, for example, in making a doubling cube decision, or in determining whether to run home and begin bearing off. The minimum total of pips needed to move a player's checkers around and off the board is called the "pip count". The difference between the two players' pip counts is frequently used as a measure of the leader's racing advantage. Players often use mental calculation techniques to determine pip counts in live play.

Backgammon is played in two principal variations, "money" and "match" play. Money play means that every point counts evenly and every game stands alone, whether money is actually being wagered or not. "Match" play means that the players play until one side scores (or exceeds) a certain number of points. The format has a significant effect on strategy. In a match, the objective is not to win the maximum possible number of points, but rather to simply reach the score needed to win the match. For example, a player leading a 9-point match by a score of 7–5 would be very reluctant to turn the doubling cube, as their opponent could take and make a costless redouble to 4, placing the entire outcome of the match on the current game. Conversely, the trailing player would double very aggressively, particularly if they have chances to win a gammon in the current game. In money play, the theoretically correct checker play and cube action would never vary based on the score.

In 1975, Emmet Keeler and Joel Spencer considered the question of when to double or accept a double using an idealized version of backgammon. In their idealized version, the probability of winning varies randomly over time by Brownian motion, and there are no gammons or backgammons. They showed that the optimal time to offer a double was when the probability of winning reached 80%, and it is wise to accept a double only if the probability of winning is at least 20%. As their assumptions do not correspond perfectly to the real game, actual doubling strategy may vary, but the 80% number still provides a possible rule of thumb.

Cheating 

To reduce the possibility of cheating, most good-quality backgammon sets use precision dice and a dice cup. This reduces the likelihood of loaded dice being used, which is the main way of cheating in face-to-face play. A common method of cheating online is the use of a computer program to find the optimal move on each turn; to combat this, many online sites use move-comparison software that identifies when a player's moves resemble those of a backgammon program. Online cheating has therefore become extremely difficult.

Social and competitive play

Legality 

In State of Oregon v. Barr, a 1982 court case pivotal to the continued widespread organised playing of backgammon in the US, the State argued that backgammon is a game of chance and that it was therefore subject to Oregon's stringent gambling laws. Paul Magriel was a key witness for the defence, contradicting Roger Nelson, the expert prosecution witness, by saying, "Game theory, however, really applies to games with imperfect knowledge, where something is concealed, such as poker. Backgammon is not such a game. Everything is in front of you. The person who uses that information in the most effective manner will win." After the closing arguments, Judge Stephen S. Walker concluded that backgammon is a game of skill, not a game of chance, and found the defendant, backgammon tournament director Ted Barr, not guilty of promoting gambling.

Club and tournament play 

Enthusiasts have formed clubs for social play of backgammon. Local clubs may hold informal gatherings, with members meeting at cafés and bars in the evening to play and converse. A few clubs offer additional services, maintaining their own facilities or offering computer analysis of troublesome plays. Around 2003, some club leaders noticed a growth of interest in backgammon, and attributed it to the game's popularity on the Internet.

A backgammon chouette permits three or more players to participate in a single game, often for money. One player competes against a team of all the other participants, and positions rotate after each game. Chouette play often permits the use of multiple doubling cubes.

Backgammon clubs may also organize tournaments. Large club tournaments sometimes draw competitors from other regions, with final matches viewed by hundreds of spectators. The top players at regional tournaments often compete in major national and international championships. Winners at major tournaments may receive prizes of tens of thousands of dollars.

International competition 

The first world championship competition in backgammon was held in Las Vegas, Nevada in 1967. Tim Holland was declared the winner that year and at the tournament the following year. For unknown reasons, there was no championship in 1970, but in 1971, Tim Holland again won the title. The competition remained in Las Vegas until 1975, when it moved to Paradise Island in the Bahamas. The years 1976, 1977 and 1978 saw "dual" World Championships, one in the Bahamas attended by the Americans, and the European Open Championships in Monte Carlo with mostly European players. In 1979, Lewis Deyong, who had promoted the Bahamas World Championship for the prior three years, suggested that the two events be combined. Monte Carlo was universally acknowledged as the site of the World Backgammon Championship and has remained as such for thirty years. The Monte Carlo tournament draws hundreds of players and spectators, and is played over the course of a week.

By the 21st century, the largest international tournaments had established the basis of a tour for top professional players. Major tournaments are held yearly worldwide. PartyGaming sponsored the first World Series of Backgammon in 2006 from Cannes and later the "Backgammon Million" tournament held in the Bahamas in January 2007 with a prize pool of one million dollars, the largest for any tournament to date. In 2008, the World Series of Backgammon ran the world's largest international events in London, the UK Masters, the biggest tournament ever held in the UK with 128 international class players; the Nordic Open, which instantly became the largest in the world with around 500 players in all flights and 153 in the championship, and Cannes, which hosted the Riviera Cup, the traditional follow-up tournament to the World Championships. Cannes also hosted the WSOB championship, the WSOB finale, which saw 16 players play three-point shootout matches for €160,000. The event was recorded for television in Europe and aired on Eurosport.

The World Backgammon Association (WBA) has been holding the biggest backgammon tour on the circuit since 2007, the "European Backgammon Tour" (EBGT). In 2011, the WBA collaborated with the online backgammon provider Play65 for the 2011 season of the European Backgammon Tour and with "Betfair" in 2012. The 2013 season of the European Backgammon Tour featured 11 stops and 19 qualified players competing for €19,000 in a grand finale in Lefkosa, Northern Cyprus.

Gambling 

When backgammon is played for money, the most common arrangement is to assign a monetary value to each point, and to play to a certain score, or until either player chooses to stop. The stakes are raised by gammons, backgammons, and use of the doubling cube. Backgammon is sometimes available in casinos. Before the commercialization of artificial neural network programs, proposition bets on specific positions were very common among backgammon players and gamblers. As with most gambling games, successful play requires a combination of luck and skill, as a single dice roll can sometimes significantly change the outcome of the game.

Cultural significance 

Backgammon is considered the national game in many countries of the Eastern Mediterranean: Egypt, Turkey, Cyprus, Syria, Israel, Palestine, Lebanon and Greece.

The popularity of the game across the region is primarily an oral tradition, and appears to have been strengthened during the era of the Ottoman Empire, which controlled the whole Eastern Mediterranean in the early modern period. Afif Bahnassi, Syria's director of antiquities, stated in 1988: "For some reason, backgammon became the rage of the Ottoman Empire. It really spread across the Arab world with the Turks, and it stayed behind when they left." The game is a common feature of coffeehouses throughout the region. Since at least the early 19th century, Damascus became well known as the preeminent location for Damascene-style wooden marquetry backgammon sets that have become famous throughout the region.

A unique feature of backgammon throughout the region is players' use of mixed Persian and Turkish numbers to announce dice rolls, rather than Arabic or other local languages. Related to this phenomenon, the game is frequently referred to as Shesh Besh, which is a rhyming combination shesh, meaning six in Persian (as well as many historical and current Semitic languages), and besh, meaning five in Turkish. Shesh besh is commonly used to refer to when a player scores a 5 and 6 at the same time on dice. This language contains six types of irregular inflections:

 1) doubles in pure Persian, (6-6 and 3-3);
 2a) unequal throws in pure Persian, higher followed by lower
 2b) unequal throws in pure Persian, with a connecting vowel in between
 3) Mixed Turkish-Persian numeral (6-5, 5-5, 4-4)
 4) alternatives for 2a and 2b in pure Turkish (6-4, 5-4, 5-1, 2-1)

In the early 20th century, as use of Classical Arabic was being promoted with the rise of Arab nationalism, efforts were made to replace the Persian-Turkish numbers used in backgammon play.

Software

Internet play 

Backgammon software has been developed not only to play and analyze games, but also for people to play one another over the internet. Dice rolls are provided by random or pseudorandom number generators. Real-time online play began with the First Internet Backgammon Server in July 1992, but there are now a range of options, many of which are commercial.

Play and analysis 

Backgammon has been studied considerably by computer scientists. Neural networks and other approaches have offered significant advances to software for gameplay and analysis. With 15 white and 15 black counters and 24 possible positions, backgammon has 18 quintillion possible legal positions.

The first strong computer opponent was BKG 9.8. It was written by Hans Berliner in the late 1970s on a DEC PDP-10 as an experiment in evaluating board game positions. Early versions of BKG played badly even against poor players, but Berliner noticed that its critical mistakes were always at transitional phases in the game. He applied principles of fuzzy logic to improve its play between phases, and by July 1979, BKG 9.8 was strong enough to play against the reigning world champion Luigi Villa. It won the match 7–1, becoming the first computer program to defeat a world champion in any board game. Berliner stated that the victory was largely a matter of luck, as the computer received more favorable dice rolls.

In the late 1980s, backgammon programmers found more success with an approach based on artificial neural networks. TD-Gammon, developed by Gerald Tesauro of IBM, was the first of these programs to play near the expert level. Its neural network was trained using temporal difference learning applied to data generated from self-play. According to assessments by Bill Robertie and Kit Woolsey, TD-Gammon's play was at or above the level of the top human players in the world. Woolsey said of the program that "There is no question in my mind that its positional judgment is far better than mine."

Tesauro proposed using rollout analysis to compare the performance of computer algorithms against human players. In this method, a Monte-Carlo evaluation of positions is conducted (typically thousands of trials) where different random dice sequences are simulated. The rollout score of the human (or the computer) is the difference of the average game results by following the selected move versus following the best move, then averaged for the entire set of taken moves.

Neural network research has resulted in three modern proprietary programs, JellyFish, Snowie and eXtreme Gammon, as well as the shareware BGBlitz and the free software GNU Backgammon. These programs not only play the game, but offer tools for analyzing games and detailed comparisons of individual moves. The strength of these programs lies in their neural networks' weights tables, which are the result of months of training. Without them, these programs play no better than a human novice. For the bearoff phase, backgammon software usually relies on a database containing precomputed equities for all possible bearoff positions. There are 54,263 bearoff positions for each side. This means there are 542632 total bearoff positions (~3 billion positions). In 1981 Hugh Sconyers wrote a computer program that solved all positions with nine checkers or fewer for both sides.  In the early 1990s Hugh extended his results to all bearoff positions. For each position there are four results: no cube, roller's cube, center cube and opponent's cube. So, Hugh's bearoff database contains the exact answers to ~12 billion bearoff situations.

Computer-versus-computer competitions are also held at Computer Olympiad events.

See also 

 Backgammon notation
 Tables games
 Tabletop games

References

Notes

Citations

Sources 

 _ (1930). The Retail Bookseller: Trade news for the Book Buyer. Vol. 33. Retail Bookseller.
 
 Bohn, Henry George (1850). The Hand-Book of Games. London: Bohn.
 
 Fiske, Willard (1905). Chess in Iceland and in Icelandic Literature: with Historical Notes on Other Table-Games. Florence: The Florentine Typographical Society.
 
 Howell, James (1835). "LXVII. [Letter] To Master G. Stone" in Familiar Letters. Vol. 2. (1850). London: Humphrey Moseley. p. 105.
 Jacoby, Oswald and Crawford John R. (1970). The Backgammon Book. NY: Viking. IA
 Papahristou, Nikolaos (2015). Decision Making in Multiplayer Environments: Application in backgammon variants. Thessaloniki: University of Macedonia. Doctoral Studies Programme.
 Parlett, David (1999). The Oxford History of Board Games. Oxford: OUP. 
 Wheatley, Henry B. (1666). The Diary of Samuel Pepys. Vol. 9. London and NY: Croscup.
  (Critical edition of Willughby's volume containing descriptions of games and pastimes, c.1660-1672. Manuscript in the Middleton collection, University of Nottingham; document reference Mi LM 14)
 Willughby, Francis, A Volume of Plaies'' containing descriptions of games and pastimes ("Francis Willughby's Book of Games"), c.1660-1672. Manuscript in the Middleton collection, University of Nottingham; document reference Mi LM 14

External links 

 
 
 
 

 
 Backgammon World Championship - Monte Carlo

 
 
Traditional board games
Articles containing video clips
17th-century board games
British board games